"Mishka" is a diminutive form of the name "Mikhail (disambiguation)".

Mishka may also refer to:

 Mishka (musician), a Bermudian reggae musician
 Mishka NYC, a clothing company and record label
 Misha, a mascot for the 1980 Olympics, also known as Mishka
 Mishka Island, a small island in Bulgaria located within the Danube river

People with the given name "Mishka"
 Mishka Henner (born 1976), Belgian-British artist
 Mishka Yaponchik (1891-1919), Jewish-Russian-Ukrainian gangster, revolutionary and military leader
 Mishka Schneiderova, a character on the Australian soap opera Neighbours

See also
 Misha (disambiguation)
 Mischa (disambiguation)